The EFP Bridge spans Owl Creek in Hot Springs County, Wyoming. The rigid 7-panel Parker (camelback) through-truss was nominated for inclusion on the National Register of Historic Places as one of forty bridges throughout Wyoming that collectively illustrate steel truss construction, a technique of bridge design that has become obsolete since the mid-twentieth century. The bridge is supported on sandstone abutments and has a timber deck,  in width.

The EFP Bridge was added to the National Register of Historic Places in 1985.

See also
List of bridges documented by the Historic American Engineering Record in Wyoming

References

External links
 at the National Park Service's NRHP database
Bridge over Owl Creek at the Wyoming State Historic Preservation Office

Buildings and structures in Hot Springs County, Wyoming
Truss bridges in the United States
Road bridges on the National Register of Historic Places in Wyoming
Transportation in Hot Springs County, Wyoming
Historic American Engineering Record in Wyoming
National Register of Historic Places in Hot Springs County, Wyoming
Steel bridges in the United States
Bridges completed in 1919
1919 establishments in Wyoming